Rupert is a traditionally animated children's television series based on the Mary Tourtel character Rupert Bear, which aired from 1991 to 1997 with 65 half-hour episodes produced. The series is produced by Nelvana, in co-production with Ellipse Programmé for the first three seasons, in association with YTV Canada, Inc. (Seasons 1–3 and 5), and ITV franchisees TVS Television (Season 1) and Scottish Television (Seasons 2–5).

Synopsis
Rupert is a very intelligent and witty bear, and he has many friends from every corner of the world. Although he lives in a small village called Nutwood, he enjoys traveling around the world, discovering new cultures, living great adventures, unraveling mysteries and unmasking villains. The Nordic culture of the European countries influences the visual of the cartoon, with many castles, citadels and clothes, besides personages, like elves and the monster of Loch Ness, that they refer to the European culture. The landscapes of Rupert's books, which inspired the series, were based in the region of Snowdonia and Vale of Clwyd, in the northern part of Wales.

Episodes

Characters
 Rupert Bear is a considerate, smart, resourceful, brave, trusty, good-spirited bear who is extremely popular with all the residents in Nutwood. On occasion, he breaks the fourth wall in addressing his observations and making comments to the viewer.
 Mr. Bear is Rupert's father. He is much more clumsy and forgetful compared to Rupert. He often smokes a pipe. It as revealed in the episode "Firebird" that both Mr. Bear and Podgy's father are part of the Nutwood Fire Brigade.
 Mrs. Bear is Rupert's mother. Like her son, she is wise and often offers advice to Rupert who later uses it during his adventures.
 Bill Badger is Rupert's best friend, who, unlike Rupert, often presents a lot of flaws, such as cowardice, impatience, clumsiness, a quick temper, and a horrible singing voice. He has a baby brother named Toby, who is fond of Bill's singing voice.
 Podgy Pig is a jolly, yet greedy and not very bright pig with a large appetite. He is very friendly to others and appears not to see that his friends sometimes find him annoying. His appetite at times can lead him and his friends into trouble, but Rupert can look past this to go out of his way to help Podgy.
 Pong Ping is a Pekingese from China who owns an elevator that can travel underground all the way to China. He has a wealth of knowledge of his culture including dragons and various magical objects. He's also good at math.
 Tiger Lily is Rupert's female and Chinese friend. The only human student in school and the member of one of few human families in Nutwood. She and her family have a lot of knowledge on magical and mystical objects.
 Algy Pug is Rupert's friend, a pug who often overestimates his abilities and takes a lot of pride in himself. Despite his flaws, he is shown to be a good and helpful friend for Rupert and others.
 Edward Trunk is another friend of Rupert. An elephant, very kind, sensitive and strong. He is often seen helping his father who works in plumbing.
 Gregory Guinea Pig is a very kind guinea pig and another friend of Rupert. Sometimes he can be nervous and scared, but he meets the challenges head on when his friends need help.
 Ottoline Otter is Rupert's friend who is an otter of a Scottish descent who loves Shakespeare and lives in an old castle that belonged to her ancestors. The castle has many secret entrances hidden all over. Ottoline has vast knowledge of each entrances' location and will prefer to use them instead of the stairs.
 Freddy and Ferdy Fox are two mischievous twin foxes who spread mischief around the village of Nutwood.
 Constable Growler is a dog and local policeman who rides a bicycle. He constantly says he needs to do "everything by the book, you know" and is always turned to by Rupert and his friends whenever they need help catching a criminal.
 The Professor is a very friendly and eccentric human scientist who resides in an old castle tower in Nutwood, who invents many incredible devices during the series. Rupert often helps out with his experiments. Once the Professor starts an experiment, he never rests. He has the catchphrase, "Think of the possibilities, my boy(s)!" whenever he is explaining his experiments and all the benefits that can come from it to Rupert and his friends.
 The Sage of Um is a jolly wizard who comes from the island of Um and flies in an upside-down umbrella. He is a friend of Tiger Lily's father; the Conjurer.
 Odmedod is a talking friendly scarecrow that lives in Farmer Turbit's farm and a friend of Rupert. 
 Reika is a Swiss human girl who lives in Lapland looking after the reindeer of Santa Claus.
 Billy Blizzard is an ambitious villain, who with the help of a magic whistle, plans to freeze the villagers of the North Pole and become the leader of the place.
 Sir Humphrey Pumphrey is a greedy, ruthless explorer who tries to find or plunder riches for his own selfish desires.

Voice cast
 Ben Sandford as Rupert Bear (1991)
 Julie Lemieux as Rupert Bear (1992–1997)
 Guy Bannerman as Mr. Bear
 Lally Cadeau as Mrs. Bear (1991–1992)
 Valerie Boyle as Mrs. Bear (1992–1997)
 Torquil Campbell as Bill Badger
 Hadley Kay as Podgy Pig
 Keith White as Algy Pug
 Oscar Hsu as Pong Ping
 Stephanie Morgenstern as Tiger Lily
 Wayne Robson as Sage of Um
 Colin Fox as Professor
 Chris Wiggins as Chinese Emperor; Chinese Conjuror; Captain Bill; additional voices
 Ho Chow as Tung Lai
 Jeremy Ratchford as Botkin
 Peter Wildman as Mr. Ribbons; Captain Sir
 Dan Hennessey as Tom
 Stephen Ouimette as additional voices
 Kristin LeMunyon as Clarice
 Allen Stewart-Coates as Cedric Pig; Constable Growler; additional voices
 Keith Knight as Timid Snowman; Mr. Chimp; The Sandman; additional voices
 Rick Jones as Yum
 Marla Lukofsky as Phoebe

Production
The series was produced by Nelvana, Ellipse Programmé, and TVS for its first season, with Scottish Television taking over for the second season onwards when TVS lost its franchise.

Broadcast

It was broadcast in syndication on YTV in Canada. In the United States, the series first aired on Nickelodeon as part of Nick Jr. in 1995 before moving to CBS Saturday mornings in 1999. Repeats of the series came to Disney Channel on the Playhouse Disney block, Toon Disney, and on Qubo from January 8, 2007, to July 25, 2020.

The series was broadcast in the United Kingdom on CITV, Tiny Pop, and KidsCo. In Australia, the series was broadcast on the ABC It aired broadcasting network and later on the Australian Nickelodeon network and on TV2 in New Zealand. It aired on RTÉ in Ireland as part of their children's block The Den.

In South America, the series was broadcast in Brazil by TV Cultura from February 2, 1998 to 2006, with audience peaks, according to the Folha de São Paulo portal, between 2002 and 2004. In South Africa, the series was broadcast on both Bop TV and M-Net as part of their wrapper programme for children K-T.V.. The series was also played in Namibia on NBC. It also aired in the United Arab Emirates; it was broadcast on the English free for air channel Dubai 33. In Portugal, the series was broadcast during the 1990s on the RTP channel. In Zimbabwe, the series aired on both ZBC and ZTV. The series was also broadcast on RTB in Brunei. In the American overseas territory Guam, the series was screened on KUAM-LP. In Kenya, it aired on KBC. In Saudi Arabia, the series was played on the country's English speaking channel Saudi 2, and In the Arab World, it aired on Spacetoon from 2000 to 2014 in Arabic.

Theme and closing song
Both the theme and closing song were composed by Milan Kymlicka They are based on Robert Schumann's The Happy Farmer, Returning from Work in F major, Op. 68, No. 10.

When the series aired on Nickelodeon in the U.S., a different theme song was used, with lyrics and vocals in the intro, and an instrumental of the same tune in the outro. This composition, Rupert's Number One, was co-penned by Sheree Jeacocke and Gerry Mosby.

Feature film version
According to BBC News, in 2000, Nelvana made plans to produce a feature film about Rupert at Hollywood studios but the project was not implemented. The film would have been released possibly between 2001 and 2002.

References

External links
 Rupert Bear at itv.com/citv
 
 Official Rupert Bear Site: http://rupertbear.co.uk
 Official Site of Nelvana's Rupert Series: http://www.nelvana.com/show/167/rupert

1990s Canadian animated television series
1991 Canadian television series debuts
1997 Canadian television series endings
1990s French animated television series
1991 French television series debuts
1997 French television series endings
Canadian children's animated action television series
Canadian children's animated adventure television series
Canadian children's animated drama television series
Canadian children's animated education television series
Canadian children's animated fantasy television series
French children's animated action television series
French children's animated adventure television series
French children's animated drama television series
French children's animated education television series
French children's animated fantasy television series
Rupert Bear
English-language television shows
French-language television shows
YTV (Canadian TV channel) original programming
Nick Jr. original programming
ITV children's television shows
Australian Broadcasting Corporation original programming
Television shows based on comic strips
Animated television series about bears
Animated television series about children
Animated television series about families
Television shows set in the United Kingdom
Forests in fiction
Television series by Nelvana
Television shows produced by Scottish Television
Television shows produced by Television South (TVS)